Poottu is a Malayalam movie directed by Rajeevnath. The story is based on U. K. Kumaran’s short story, Koodaram and depicts the life in an apartment complex when the lock system suddenly malfunctions. The movie had its world premiere in Dubai on Saturday, 28 January 2017.

Shibu Gangadharan is the associate director of this movie. The film, with around 30 Indian expatriate actors, was shot in Dubai and Fujeirah and was completed within 13 days. The movie launched its official trailer on 8 March 2017 and announced its theatrical release in April 2017. It was premiered on television on 3 September 2017.

Cast

 Gopan Mavelikara as Shivan
 Albert Alex 
 Sanju Philips as Kiran
 Vineetha
 Raju Thomas as Jerry
 Dipu Chacko as Peter
 Kris Iyer as Venu
 Shruthi
 Kuruvilla John

References

External links 
 
 
 
 

2010s Malayalam-language films
2017 films
Films directed by Rajeevnath